Sologub may refer to:

 Fyodor Sologub (1863-1927), Russian Symbolist poet
 Grzegorz Sołogub (1918-1986), Polish aviator
 Natalya Sologub (born 1975), Belarusian sprinter